Fedele Gentile (1908–1993) was an Italian film actor.

Selected filmography
 The Man with the Claw (1931)
 Captain Fracasse (1940)
 Big Shoes (1940)
 The Secret Lover (1941)
 Fedora (1942)
 Bengasi (1942)
 Souls in Turmoil (1942)
 The Ten Commandments (1945)
 The Whole City Sings (1945)
 The Opium Den (1947)
 Eleonora Duse (1947)
 Eleven Men and a Ball (1948)
 The Two Sisters (1950)
 The Black Captain (1951)
 Lorenzaccio (1951)
 Il romanzo della mia vita (1952)
 My Life Is Yours (1953)
 Captain Phantom (1953)
 Condemned to Hang (1953)
 Naples Is Always Naples (1954)
 Barrier of the Law (1954)
 Supreme Confession (1956)
 Herod the Great (1958)
 Devil's Cavaliers (1959)
 Juke box urli d'amore (1959)
 Knight of 100 Faces (1960)
 Caesar the Conqueror (1962)
 Revolt of the Praetorians (1964)
 The Magnificent Gladiator (1964)
 Vengeance of the Vikings (1965)
 Drummer of Vengeance (1971)

References

Bibliography
 Roy Kinnard & Tony Crnkovich. Italian Sword and Sandal Films, 1908–1990. McFarland, 2017.

External links

1908 births
1993 deaths
Italian male film actors
People from Molise